{{Automatic taxobox
| image = LutraCanadensis fullres.jpg
| image_caption = North American river otters (Lontra canadensis)
| taxon = Lontra
| authority = Gray, 1843
| type_species = Lutra canadensis
| type_species_authority = Gray, 1843
| subdivision_ranks = Species
| subdivision = L. canadensisL. felinaL. longicaudisL. provocax†L. weiri| range_map = Lontra range.png
| range_map_caption = Lontra range
}}Lontra is a genus of otters from the Americas.

Species
These species were previously included in the genus Lutra'', together with the Eurasian otter, but they have now been moved to a separate genus.
The genus comprises four living and one known fossil species:

Extant species

Extinct species

References

 
Otters
Fauna of the Americas
Mammal genera
Taxa named by John Edward Gray